HMS Blenheim was a 74-gun third rate ship of the line of the Royal Navy, launched on 31 May 1813 at Deptford Dockyard.

Blenheim was placed on harbour service in 1831. Her captain, Humphrey Fleming Senhouse, died on board Blenheim in the morning of 13 June 1841, from fever contracted during operations in Canton, China, in May 1841.

On 20 March 1847, Blenheim was in collision with the British brig Cactus in the River Thames and was driven ashore on the Essex bank. The tug  attempted to refloat Blenheim, but Blenheim and Monkey collided and Blenheim was driven into the brig Agility, which was severely damaged. Monkey assisted in beaching Agility on the Essex bank to prevent her from sinking. Blenheim subsequently was refloated and taken in to Woolwich, Kent.

Blenheim converted to screw propulsion in 1847.

In 1854–1855 Blenheim saw service in the Baltic Sea as a 60-gun steam screw vessel. During this service a 32-pounder cannonball struck and became embedded in her mast in 1855.

Blenheim was broken up in 1865.

See also
 Patricio Lynch, Chilean sailor on the Blenheim

Notes

References

External links
 

Ships of the line of the Royal Navy
Vengeur-class ships of the line
Ships built in Deptford
1813 ships
First Opium War ships of the United Kingdom
Crimean War naval ships of the United Kingdom
Maritime incidents in March 1847